Cyrus was launched in 1811 in Whitby. She spent her early career as a transport. Then after the war she made one or more voyages to Bengal and Ceylon under a license from the British East India Company. After her return she traded between Great Britain and North America. She was wrecked at Quebec in November 1844.

Career
Cyrus initially sailed as a transport. She first entered Lloyd's Register (LR) in 1818.

In 1813 the EIC had lost its monopoly on the trade between India and Britain. British ships were then free to sail to India or the Indian Ocean under a license from the EIC. Her owners applied for a licence on 2 September 1815 and received it that same day.

On 4 May 1823 Cyrus, Doeg, master, arrived at Liverpool from Kinsale.

Fate
Cyrus stranded on 3 November 1844 at Portneuf, with the loss of her master and two of her crew. She was on a voyage from Quebec City to London. She was stripped. Her entry in LR for 1844 carried the annotation "stranded".

Citations and references
Citations

References
 
 
 

1811 ships
Ships built in Whitby
Age of Sail merchant ships of England
Maritime incidents in November 1844